Nadejda Palovandova (born 1 September 1975) is a Moldovan archer. She competed in the women's individual event at the 1996 Summer Olympics.

References

External links
 

1975 births
Living people
Moldovan female archers
Olympic archers of Moldova
Archers at the 1996 Summer Olympics
Place of birth missing (living people)